Lake Chelan Dam officially known as the Lake Chelan Hydroelectric Project is located approximately  north of the city of Wenatchee in Chelan County. The powerhouse is located near the community of Chelan Falls. The reservoir has  of usable water storage. The 10-year average generation for the Project is 365,000 megawatt hours.

History 
The Chelan River has a history of dam development for navigation, power generation, and water supply. The future spillway segment of the dam was calculated and built to avoid a recurrence of such flooding. The dam was built to raise the level of Lake Chelan and completed in 1892. It was constructed to provide water for south Chelan real estate and navigation to the city of Chelan. It washed out during June of that year, only to be replaced by another structure built by the newly formed Chelan Water Power Company in 1893. The larger and stronger dam was designed to raise the lake level enough to allow steamships to land at Chelan. Nevertheless, this structure lasted only a year before washing out in a massive flood in June 1894. In early 1899, M.M. Kingman purchased the Chelan Water Power Company and built another dam, for power generation. The turning on of lights was celebrated in Chelan during May 1903. The Chelan Water Power Company was purchased by the Chelan Electric Company in 1906. It was then purchased by Spokane-based Washington Water Power Company in 1925. A year later, Washington Water Power received a 50-year federal license to construct the existing dam and powerhouse. The first generating unit was placed in commercial operation in September 1927, followed by the second unit 11 months later.

The Chelan County Public Utility District purchased the Lake Chelan Hydro Project from Washington Water Power (now Avista Corp.) in July 1955, with the proceeds of a $21 million bond issue. All of the power generated by the Project is available for Chelan County homes and businesses.

Description
The dam is a steel-reinforced concrete gravity structure. It contains eight spillway bays. When the spillway gates are open, water is discharged down the normally dry Chelan River channel. Water to power the turbine generators is delivered through an underground penstock connecting the dam and the powerhouse.

The powerhouse is located at Chelan Falls. Besides the two generating units, the powerhouse contains a Control Room, shop facilities, switching equipment, crane, and communications equipment. Water traveling down the power tunnel is directed against two turbines rated at 24 megawatts each. The turbines rotate at 300 revolutions per minute. The original turbines were replaced in 1985 and 1986. The turbines are connected to the generators by steel shafts. They provide a combined peaking capability of 58 megawatts. The original generators were rewound in 1951 and 1952. After passing around and through the turbine blades, water is discharged into the tailrace located on the east side of the powerhouse where it flows into the Columbia River.

See also

List of dams in the Columbia River watershed
Rocky Reach Dam
Rock Island Dam

References

External links 
Lake Chelan Hydro Project Dam owner: Chelan County Public Utility District

Buildings and structures in Chelan County, Washington
Dams in Washington (state)
Hydroelectric power plants in Washington (state)
United States local public utility dams
Dams completed in 1927
Energy infrastructure completed in 1927
National Register of Historic Places in Chelan County, Washington
Historic districts on the National Register of Historic Places in Washington (state)